Sail-sous-Couzan is a commune in the Loire department in central France.

Geography
The river Lignon du Forez flows through the commune.

Population

Sights
 The Château de Couzan is a ruined castle whose construction dates from the 11th to the 14th century. It has been listed as a monument historique by the French Ministry of Culture since 1890.
 12th-century church, a monument historique since 1928.

See also
Communes of the Loire department

References

Sailsouscouzan